Firuzjah Rural District is a rural district in Bandpey-ye Sharqi District, Babol County, Mazandaran Province, Iran. At the 2006 census, its population was 3,201, in 861 families. The rural district has 61 villages.

References 

Rural Districts of Mazandaran Province
Babol County